Solanum furcatum is a species of plant in the family Solanaceae known by the common name forked nightshade. It is native to South America. It is known elsewhere as an introduced species.

References

External links
Jepson Manual Treatment

furcatum